Khesht Rural District is a rural district (dehestan) in Khesht District, Kazerun County, Fars Province, Iran. At the 2006 census, its population was 8,677, in 1,916 families.  The rural district has 31 villages.

References 

Rural Districts of Fars Province
Kazerun County